The Last of the Knucklemen is a 1979 Australian film directed by Tim Burstall.

Plot
The story involves a gang of rough miners. Tom (Peter Hehir) turns up at the mine looking for a place to hide. He allies himself with the mining foreman Tarzan (Gerard Kennedy) before the big fight.

Cast
 Gerard Kennedy as Tarzan
 Michael Preston as Pansy
 Peter Hehir as Tom
 Dennis Miller as Horse
 Michael Caton as Monk
 Steve Rackman as Carl
 Michael Duffield as Methuselah
 Steve Bisley as Mad Dog
 Stewart Faichney as Tassie
 Gerry Duggan as Old Arthur

Production
Before Tim Burstall started on Eliza Fraser he thought Hexagon Productions should make a male bonding film, and considered Rusty Bugles, The Odd Angry Shot and Last of the Knucklemen. He eventually decided on the latter. He had to wait to get the rights because the Melbourne Theatre Company were negotiating to sell the rights to the US but this fell through.

Burstall did the adaptation himself, which was largely faithful to the play. He felt that the film was weak in the first half setting up characters. Burstall:
I was trying to take the ocker stuff and cross it, as I think John Powers' play was, with anthropology. Before I rehearsed the cast, I got them to read 'The Territorial Imparity of the Native Aid'. I wanted it to be seen not just as ockerism but as anthropology. But the only people who got that were the French. It was bought in France and it's done terribly well there – much better than it ever did in Australia.

The movie was shot over six weeks in September and October 1978 mostly on sets at Melbourne's Cambridge Studios. Exterior scenes were shot in the South Australian outback town of Andamooka.

Reception
The Last of the Knucklemen grossed $180,000 at the box office in Australia, which is equivalent to $703,800 in 2009 dollars. Reviews however were strong. Burstall:
I don't think they knew how to market it. A lot of women said to me, 'I'd never go to a picture that had the title The Last of the Knucklemen'. But nobody ever looked at it as an analysis of the way men work. It's a right-wing view of unionism.

AFI Awards, 1979
Best Actor - Mike Preston - Nominated
Supporting Actor - Michael Duffield - Nominated
Adapted Screenplay - Tim Burstall - Nominated
Original Music - Bruce Smeaton - Nominated
Sound - John Phillips, Edward McQueen-Mason and Peter Fenton - Nominated
Art Direction - Leslie Binns - Nominated
Costume Design - Kevin Regan - Nominated

Home media
The Last of the Knucklemen was released on DVD by Umbrella Entertainment in January 2012. The DVD is compatible with region codes 2 and 4 and includes special features such as the trailer, photo gallery and interviews with John Powers, Gerard Kennedy, Dan Burstall, Steve Bisley and Michael Caton.

Original play

John Power's play had been produced in 1973.

Leslie Rees described it as "a sequence of sketches using the same basic characters but without much development or thematic resolution".

It was performed Off-Broadway in 1983 at the American Theater of Actors, featuring Kevin O'Connor and Dennis Quaid.

See also
 Cinema of Australia

References

Further reading

External links
 
 The Last of the Knucklemen at Oz Movies

1979 films
1979 drama films
Australian drama films
Films shot in Melbourne
Films directed by Tim Burstall
Films scored by Bruce Smeaton
1970s English-language films